Desperate Ground is the sixth album from the Portland-based indie rock band The Thermals. The album was released on April 15, 2013, on Saddle Creek Records. It was produced by John Agnello (Dinosaur Jr, Sonic Youth) in Hoboken, New Jersey. Agnello and The Thermals completed the record and evacuated the studio just hours before Hurricane Sandy ravaged New Jersey.

The title came from The Art of War by Sun Tzu.

Reception

Reviews of Desperate Ground represent a diverse mix of opinions on the album. The album holds a score of 73 out of 100 from Metacritic, indicating "generally favorable reviews".

Track listing

Personnel
 Kathy Foster – bass, vocals
 Hutch Harris – guitar, vocals
 Westin Glass – drums, vocals

Chart performance

References

2013 albums
The Thermals albums
Saddle Creek Records albums
Albums produced by John Agnello